In Greek mythology, Cymodoce (Ancient Greek: Κυμοδόκη Kymodokê means 'wave-receiver or wave-gatherer') was the one of the 50 Nereids, sea-nymph daughters of the 'Old Man of the Sea' Nereus and the Oceanid Doris. She was briefly mentioned in Statius' Silvae.

Mythology 
Cymodoce and her other sisters appeared to Thetis when she cries out in sympathy for the grief of Achilles for his slain friend Patroclus. She was also said to be a companion of Aphrodite.

In some accounts, Cymodoce, together with her sisters Thalia, Nesaea and Spio, was one of the nymphs in the train of Cyrene  Later on, these four together with their other sisters Thetis, Melite and Panopea, were able to help the hero Aeneas and his crew during a storm.

According to Virgil, when Aeneas landed in Italy, a local warlord named Turnus set his pine-framed ships ablaze. Upon seeing that, the goddess Cybele, remembering that those hulls had been crafted from trees felled on her holy mountains, transformed the vessels into sea nymphs. Cymodoce was one of those newly created nymphs.

Notes

References 

 Gaius Julius Hyginus, Fabulae from The Myths of Hyginus translated and edited by Mary Grant. University of Kansas Publications in Humanistic Studies. Online version at the Topos Text Project.
 Hesiod, Theogony with an English Translation by Hugh G. Evelyn-White. Cambridge, MA., Harvard University Press; London, William Heinemann Ltd. 1914. Online version at the Perseus Digital Library
 Homer, The Iliad with an English Translation by A.T. Murray, Ph.D. in two volumes. Cambridge, MA., Harvard University Press; London, William Heinemann, Ltd. 1924. . Online version at the Perseus Digital Library.
 Homer, Homeri Opera in five volumes. Oxford, Oxford University Press. 1920. . Greek text available at the Perseus Digital Library.
Kerényi, Carl, The Gods of the Greeks, Thames and Hudson, London, 1951.
Publius Vergilius Maro, Aeneid. Theodore C. Williams. trans. Boston. Houghton Mifflin Co. 1910. Online version at the Perseus Digital Library.
Publius Vergilius Maro, Bucolics, Aeneid, and Georgics. J. B. Greenough. Boston. Ginn & Co. 1900. Latin text available at the Perseus Digital Library.
 Publius Vergilius Maro, Bucolics, Aeneid, and Georgics of Vergil. J. B. Greenough. Boston. Ginn & Co. 1900. Online version at the Perseus Digital Library.

Nereids
Deities in the Iliad
Deities in the Aeneid
Metamorphoses into humanoids in Greek mythology